The Luangwa River is one of the major tributaries of the Zambezi River, and one of the four biggest rivers of Zambia. The river generally floods in the rainy season (December to March) and then falls considerably in the dry season.  It is one of the biggest unaltered rivers in Southern Africa and the  that make up the surrounding valley are home to abundant wildlife.

Source and Upper-Middle Luangwa Valley 

Note: distances stated are approximate straight-line distances from source. The Luangwa rises in the Lilonda and Mafinga Hills in north-east Zambia at an elevation of around 1500 m, near the border with Tanzania and Malawi, and flows in a southwesterly direction through a broad valley. About 150 km from its source it has dropped to an elevation of about 690 m and becomes a meandering river with a flood-plain several kilometres wide. Over the next 300 km the meanders increase, with many oxbow lakes and abandoned meanders. Near Mfuwe, the river's elevation has dropped to about 520 m, the flood plain is about 10 km wide and the valley reaches about 100 km wide, with a north-west escarpment (Muchinga Escarpment) about 700 m high, and a south-western escarpment about 450 m high. In the dry season some sections, especially in the upper reaches, dry out completely, leaving isolated pools.

The upper and middle parts of the valley contain the North Luangwa National Park and South Luangwa National Parks of Zambia, which are among some of the finest in Africa. The river itself is home to large populations of hippopotami and crocodiles.  The world's largest concentration of hippos lives in the Luangwa Valley. In the dry season they are restricted by the shrinking river and pools, and are easily seen especially in isolated pools.

In addition to being a source of water, the oxbow lakes and pools increase the biodiversity of the valley in other ways. The hippopotami which live in them feed on land vegetation at night. Their dung feeds some fish and fertilises the pools, increasing fish life which in turn feed crocodiles and birds.

In the dry season, the grazing land animals and their predators congregate near the river and pools, and are easily seen. In the rainy season they graze further afield and are more easily hidden in the growth of new vegetation.

At about 500 km the valley narrows to about 50 km and becomes divided by a ridge into two parallel valleys, with a tributary, the Lukusashi River in a 25 km-wide valley to the north-west, and the Luangwa in a 15 km wide valley to the southeast. The river meanders less, and the flood plain narrows.

The principal settlement in the Middle and Upper Luangwa Valley is Mfuwe which serves the tourism industry and has an international airport.  Very few humans otherwise inhabit the valley.

Lower Luangwa 

At 600 km the river abruptly enters a narrow valley between hills rising some 200 m from the broader valley floor, becoming almost a gorge. About 700 km from source the Luangwa merges with its tributary the Lukusashi after the latter has merged with the Lunsemfwa River coming from the opposite direction, and turns due south through a steep narrow valley: this is its exit from the Luangwa Rift Valley (see following section). After only 20 km it emerges from the hills into the broad valley of the Zambezi and meanders over sandy flats about 1.5 km wide in a flood plain of 3–5 km wide. It merges with the deeper Zambezi at Luangwa town. The lower section of the river forms the border between Zambia and Mozambique.

The Luangwa Rift Valley 

This section explains the geomorphology of the Luangwa Valley. It is a rift valley or graben forming a south-west extension of the east African Rift, branching off its Lake Rukwa-Lake Malawi southern section, and reaching almost as far as Lusaka. The junction is not obvious because it filled with material spewed out from an ancient, extinct volcano. There are at least 20 hot springs, characteristic of a rift valley, in the valley or on its escarpments.

The Luangwa flows along four-fifths of the Luangwa Rift Valley to the point where it meets the Lukusashi and the Lunsemfwa which has come from the opposite direction. At one time, millions of years ago, there was no way out and the Luangwa Rift filled with a Rift Valley Lake called the Madumabisa Lake, which rivalled Lake Malawi in size. The water of the lake overflowed in a river to the south-west, towards what is now the Kalahari, where it combined with the Okavango, Upper Zambezi, Cuando and Kafue rivers, emptying into the Limpopo River and flowing to the Indian Ocean.

Several geological events combined to produce the current river systems. Faulting produced another graben just to the south of the Luangwa Rift, and running east–west: the Zambezi Rift Valley and the Chicoa Trough. A tributary of the Shire River at the south end of the Great Rift Valley then cut back eastwards through the Chicao Trough and Zambezi Valley, capturing the southerly overspill of the Madumabisa Lake. This tributary became the Zambezi, which over millions of years captured the Kafue, Cuando and the upper Zambezi. Faulting lowered the land between the Luangwa Rift and the Zambezi Rift allowing Madumabisa Lake to drain out into the Zambezi in a channel which became the lower Luangwa River.

The Luangwa as a barrier 

The Luangwa Rift Valley and rivers within it form a natural barrier, with a very low population density. This, the steepness of the terrain, and the existence of the wildlife reserves have resulted in no highways crossing the  valley between the Lusaka-Kabwe roads in the west and the Isoka-Chisenga road in the north, a distance of about 800 km. The lower Luangwa Valley is crossed by just one road, the Great East Road at the Luangwa Bridge, about 10 km south of the Luangwa-Lunsemfwa confluence.

Further reading 
 Camerapix: Spectrum Guide to Zambia, Camerapix International Publishing, Nairobi, 1996.
 Terracarta: Zambia, 2nd edition, International Travel Maps, Vancouver, Canada, 2000.
 Jean-Jacques Tiercelin et al., "Source Rocks and Reservoirs in Rift Lake Basins over the Past 300 Ma in Central and Eastern Africa", AAPG Annual Meeting, Houston, 2002. Accessed 18 February 2007.
 A.E. Moore: '"Drainage evolution in south-central Africa since the breakup of Gondwana". South African Journal of Geology, March 2001, v. 104; no. 1; p. 47-68.
 J.H. Dumisani:  "Seismotectonics of Zimbabwe." African Journal of Science and Technology (AJST), Science and Engineering Series Vol. 1, No.4, pp. 22–28
 “Hot springs in the Luangwa Valley”. The Northern Rhodesia Journal, Vol 2 No 3 (1954) pp. 65–66. Accessed 26 February 2007.

References

Rivers of Zambia
Tributaries of the Zambezi River
Geography of Central Province, Zambia
Geography of Eastern Province, Zambia